is a Japanese manga series written and illustrated by Masahiro Morio. It was serialized in Shogakukan's seinen manga magazine Weekly Young Sunday from March 2007 to July 2008, when the magazine ceased its publication; it continued in YS Special from September to December 2008. Its chapters were collected in seven tankōbon volumes. A direct sequel, titled The!! Beach Stars, was serialized in Shogakukan's shōnen manga magazine Monthly Shōnen Sunday from May 2009 to April 2010, with its chapters collected in two tankōbon volumes.

Publication
The series later ran in YS Special from September 25 to December 25, 2008. Shogakukan collected its chapters in seven tankōbon volumes, released from July 5, 2007, to March 30, 2009.

A direct continuation, titled , was serialized in Shogakukan's then-brand-new shōnen manga magazine Monthly Shōnen Sunday from May 12, 2009, to April 12, 2010. Shogakukan collected its chapters in two tankōbon volumes, released on February 12 and June 11, 2010.

The manga was licensed in France by Kurokawa.

Notes

References

External links
  
  

Beach volleyball
Seinen manga
Shogakukan manga
Shōnen manga
Volleyball in anime and manga